Leipzig-Leutzsch is a railway station located in Leipzig, Germany. The station is located on the junction of the Leipzig–Großkorbetha railway and Leipzig–Probstzella railway. The train services are operated by Deutsche Bahn. Since December 2013 the station is served by the S-Bahn Mitteldeutschland.

The railway station underwent major renovations in 2008, when a new access point was built on Georg-Schwarz-Straße, together with three new 140 m platforms. The old station building is located further north-east, on Am Ritterschlößchen, opposite the intersection with Am Sportpark.

Gallery

References

External links
 

Leutzsch
Leipzig Leutzsch